XEUN-FM is a radio station in Mexico City. Broadcasting on 96.1 FM, XEUN-FM is owned by the National Autonomous University of Mexico (UNAM) as a sister to XEUN-AM 860 and XHUNAM-TDT 20.

History
XEUN-FM signed on July 16, 1959, from a transmitter located on the Torre Rectoría (Rectory Tower), broadcasting with 1 kW of power.

XEUN-FM's power was increased to 50 kW when the station moved to new facilities in 1976.

In 1992, the FM station moved to a new tower in Ajusco, on land that had been donated to UNAM in 1986 by the government of the Federal District; the move decreased the station's power to 35 kW, which then increased to its current 100 kW with another new transmitter in 1995.

Programming
XEUN-FM split from its AM simulcast upon the move to Ajusco in 1992. The division of programming across the two stations is specialized: 96.1 FM's broadcast day is composed of largely music programs, while 860 AM features predominantly speech programs.

On March 25, 2020, as a contingency due to the COVID-19 pandemic, Radio UNAM began simulcasting its FM programming on AM until further notice.

References

Radio stations in Mexico City
Radio stations established in 1959
University radio stations in Mexico
National Autonomous University of Mexico